Mister Magoo is an American animated television series which was produced from November 7, 1960 to February 2, 1962. A single episode included five four-minute shorts and could either be aired together with bumpers as a single half-hour show, or it could be split up with one short aired each weekday, along with other cartoons. It was produced by United Productions of America. The series' voices were Jim Backus, Mel Blanc, Jerry Hausner, Benny Rubin, Paul Frees, and Frank Nelson.

The show was followed by two related series: the 1964-1965 show The Famous Adventures of Mr. Magoo and the 1977 What's New, Mr. Magoo?

Cast
 Jim Backus as Mr. Magoo
 Mel Blanc as Tycoon Magoo, Worcestershire, Additional voices
 Jerry Hausner as Waldo 
 Daws Butler as Prezly
 Benny Rubin as Charlie
 Paul Frees as Additional voices
 Frank Nelson as Additional voices
 Bea Benaderet as Mother Magoo 
 June Foray as Mother Magoo 
 Julie Bennett as Millie, Additional voices 
 Jean Vander Pyl as Madam Lafoo 
 Herb Vigran as Mr. McCloy

Episodes

References

External links
 

1960 American television series debuts
1962 American television series endings
1960s American animated television series
American children's animated comedy television series
English-language television shows
Television series by Universal Television
Mr. Magoo
First-run syndicated television programs in the United States